United Hardware Distributing Co. is a  dealer-owned corporation based in Plymouth, Minnesota which provides distribution services for about 610 member-owned stores, the majority of which operate under the Hardware Hank trade name.  In addition, the company services about 800 other stores owned by non-members.  2006 sales were $183 million.  It was founded in 1945 as a furniture and hardware distributor. The furniture division was sold in 1953, and it became a dealer-owned  retailers' cooperative in 1957 when majority control was assumed by a group of hardware store owners. In addition to servicing the Hardware Hank stores, United Hardware also services TrustWorthy Hardware Stores, Golden Rule Lumber Centers, and Ranch & Pet Supply stores. It is a member of the Distribution America buying group.

Ranch & Pet Supply 

Ranch & Pet Supply is a program offered by United Hardware Distributing Co. that provides products and services to retailers that market their business to hobby farmers and pet owners. The product assortment includes feed and supplies for horses, dogs, cats, wild birds, rabbits, poultry, calves, deer and small animals, as well as fencing, work clothing and boots, and general farm supplies. 
Ranch & Pet Supply also has a customized advertising program, store planning services, store signage and decor, and other services to help retailers increase sales and profits

Statistics 

According to the National Retail Hardware Association, United Hardware is the fifth largest wholesaling and distribution cooperative in the hardware store industry in the United States, behind Ace Hardware, Do it Best,  True Value, and Handy Hardware.

References 
 National Retail Hardware Association, Market Measures 2005 Annual Report, p. 36 Do It Yourself Retailing

External links 
 United Hardware
 Hardware Hank

Companies based in Plymouth, Minnesota
Economy of the Northwestern United States
Economy of the Midwestern United States
Hardware stores of the United States
American companies established in 1945
Retail companies established in 1945
Organizations established in 1945
Retailers' cooperatives in the United States
1945 establishments in Minnesota